青山 is an East Asian word that means "green mountain" or "blue mountain". It may refer to:

Aoyama (disambiguation), places in Japan
Castle Peak (disambiguation), places in Hong Kong
Qingshan (disambiguation), places in China